Totenkopf  (i.e. skull, literally "dead person's head") is the German word for the skull and crossbones symbol. The "skull and crossbones" symbol is an old international symbol for death, the defiance of death, danger, or the dead, as well as piracy or toxicity. It consists usually of the human skull with or without the mandible and often includes two crossed long-bones (femurs), most often depicted with the crossbones being behind some part of the skull. 

In English, the term Totenkopf is commonly associated with 19th- and 20th-century German military use, particularly in Nazi Germany.

Naval use 
In early modern sea warfare, buccaneers used the totenkopf as a pirate flag: a skull or other skeletal parts as a death threat and as a demand to hand over a ship. The symbol continues to be used by modern navies.

German military

Prussia

Use of the Totenkopf as a military emblem began under Frederick the Great, who formed a regiment of Hussar  cavalry in the Prussian army commanded by Colonel von Ruesch, the Husaren-Regiment Nr. 5 (von Ruesch). It adopted a black uniform with a Totenkopf emblazoned on the front of its mirlitons and wore it on the field in the War of Austrian Succession and in the Seven Years' War. The Totenkopf remained a part of the uniform when the regiment was reformed into Leib-Husaren Regiments Nr.1 and Nr.2 in 1808.

Brunswick 

In 1809, during the War of the Fifth Coalition, Frederick William, Duke of Brunswick-Wolfenbüttel raised a force of volunteers to fight Napoleon Bonaparte, who had conquered the Duke's lands. The Brunswick corps was provided with black uniforms, giving rise to their nickname, the Black Brunswickers. Both hussar cavalry and infantry in the force wore a Totenkopf badge, either in mourning for the duke's father, Charles William Ferdinand, Duke of Brunswick-Wolfenbüttel, who had been killed at the Battle of Jena–Auerstedt in 1806, or according to some sources, as a sign of revenge against the French. After fighting their way through Germany, the Black Brunswickers entered British service and fought with them in the Peninsular War and at the Battle of Waterloo. The Brunswick corps was eventually incorporated into the Prussian Army in 1866.

German Empire 

The skull continued to be used by the Prussian and Brunswick armed forces until 1918, and some of the stormtroopers that led the last German offensives on the Western Front in 1918 used skull badges. Luftstreitkräfte fighter pilots Georg von Hantelmann and Kurt Adolf Monnington are just two of a number of Central Powers military pilots who used the Totenkopf as their personal aircraft insignia.

Weimar Republic 
 
The Totenkopf was used in Germany throughout the interwar period, most prominently by the Freikorps. In 1933, it was in use by the regimental staff and the 1st, 5th, and 11th squadrons of the Reichswehrs 5th Cavalry Regiment as a continuation of a tradition from the Kaiserreich.

Nazi Germany
In the early days of the Nazi Party, Julius Schreck, the leader of the Stabswache (Adolf Hitler's bodyguard unit), resurrected the use of the Totenkopf as the unit's insignia. This unit grew into the Schutzstaffel (SS), which continued to use the Totenkopf as insignia throughout its history. According to a writing by Reichsführer-SS Heinrich Himmler, the Totenkopf had the following meaning:

The Skull is the reminder that you shall always be willing to put your self at stake for the life of the whole community.

The Totenkopf was also used as the unit insignia of the Panzer forces of the German Heer (Army), and also by the Panzer units of the Luftwaffe, including those of the elite Fallschirm-Panzer Division 1 Hermann Göring.

Both the 3rd SS Panzer Division of the Waffen-SS, and the World War II era Luftwaffe's 54th Bomber Wing Kampfgeschwader 54 were given the unit name "Totenkopf", and used a strikingly similar-looking graphic skull-crossbones insignia as the SS units of the same name. The 3rd SS Panzer Division also had skull patches on their uniform collars instead of the SS sieg rune.

Non-German military 

 A skull and crossbones has often been a symbol of pirates, especially in the form of the Jolly Roger, but usually having the crossbones below the skull's lower mandibile (if present) rather than behind it, as used by pirate Samuel Bellamy in one example.
 The uniform of the Spanish Army's Lusitania Dragoon Regiment during part of the 18th century included three skull and crossbones in the cuffs, and in 1902 the skull and crossbones insignia was authorized again to replace the regiment number on the sides of the collar.
 It was used as the emblem on the uniforms of Greek revolutionaries of Alexander Ypsilantis' Sacred Band (1821) during the Wallachian uprising of 1821
 Armenian fedayis, during the First World War against the Ottoman Empire, used a skull with two bolt rifles under the words "revenge revenge" in their flags.
 The British Army's Royal Lancers continue to use the skull and crossbones in their emblem, inherited from its use by the 17th Lancers, a unit raised in 1759 following General Wolfe's death in Quebec. The emblem contains an image of a death's head, and the words 'Or Glory', chosen in commemoration of Wolfe.
 In 1792, a regiment of Hussards de la Mort (Death Hussars) was formed during the French Revolution by the French National Assembly and were organized and named by Kellerman. The group of 200 volunteers were from wealthy families and their horses were supplied from the King's Stables. They were formed to defend against various other European states in the wake of the revolution. They participated in the Battle of Valmy and its members also participated in the Battle of Fleurus (1794). They had the following mottos: ,  and  – Victory or death; Freedom or death; and Live free or die.
 Although not exactly a Totenkopf per se, the Chilean guerrilla leader Manuel Rodríguez used the symbol on his elite forces called  ("Hussars of death"). It is still used by the Chilean Army's 3rd Cavalry Regiment.
 The primarily Prussian 41st Regiment New York Volunteer Infantry (mustered on 6 June 1861; mustered out 9 December 1865) wore a skull insignia.
 The Vengeurs de la Mort ("death avengers"), an irregular unit of Commune de Paris, 1871.
 The Portuguese Army Police 2nd Lancers Regiment use a skull-and-crossbones image in their emblem, similar to the one used by the Queen's Royal Lancers.
 The Kingdom of Sweden's Hussar Regiments wore a death's head emblem in the Prussian Style on the front of the mirleton.
 Ramón Cabrera's regiment adopted in 1838 a skull with crossbones flanked by an olive branch and a sword on a black flag during the Spanish Carlist Wars.
 Serbian Chetniks wore a death's head emblem in several conflicts: guerrilla in Old Serbia, First and Second Balkan Wars, World War I (both defense and resistance) and World War II.
 Some Macedonian-Bulgarian komitas that were members of the Internal Macedonian Revolutionary Organization wore a death's head emblem, usually with crossed revolver and qama below the skull and crossbones (similar to the Serbian ones) throughout the existence of the organization in several conflicts: Macedonian Struggle (Ilinden–Preobrazhenie Uprising, the Balkan Wars), World War I, during the interwar period in Macedonia, Kingdom of Serbs, Croats and Slovenes, and in World War II. The most prominent example being Pitu Guli who wears one in his only known photo, and his son Steryu Gulev.
 The Italian elite storm-troopers of the Arditi used a skull with a dagger between its teeth as a symbol during World War I. Various versions of skulls were also later used by the Italian Fascists.
 The Russian Kornilov's Shock Detachment (8th Army) adopted a death's head emblem in 1917. Then after World War I, the unit became Kornilov's Shock Regiment as a part of the White Russian Volunteer Army during the Russian Civil War.
 The Estonian Kuperjanov's Partisan Battalion used the skull-and-crossbones as their insignia (since 1918); the  Infantry Battalion continues to use the skull and crossbones as their insignia today.
 Two Polish small cavalry units used death's head emblem during Polish–Ukrainian War and Polish–Soviet War –  (also known as  i.e.
 During 1943–1945 the Italian Black Brigades and numerous other forces fighting for the Italian Social Republic wore various versions of skulls on their uniforms, berets, and caps.
 The United States Marine Corps Reconnaissance Battalions use the skull-and-crossbones symbol in their emblem.
 The No. 100 Squadron RAF (Royal Air Force) continue to use a flag depicting a skull and crossbones, supposedly in reference to a flag stolen from a French brothel in 1918.
 The Batalhão de Operações Policiais Especiais, a special unit within the military police of Rio de Janeiro state, Brazil, uses the skull emblem to differentiate their team from the regular units.
 South Korea's 3rd Infantry Division (백골부대) have a skull-and-crossbones in their emblem.
 Many United States Cavalry reconnaissance troops or squadrons utilize a skull insignia, often wearing the traditional Stetson hat, and backed by either crossed cavalry sabers, crossed rifles, or some other variation, as an unofficial unit logo. These logos are incorporated into troop T-shirts, challenge coins, or other items designed to enhance morale and esprit de corps.
 The Azov Regiment of the Ukrainian Army has used the totenkopf.

Police use 
The uniform of the Ordnungspolizei -- Nazi Germany's uniformed police could feature the totenkopf. Peaked visor cap of the Sicherheitsdienst SD with skull emblem.
 "Punisher" variations of the totenkopf appear on police vehicles.
 Challenge coins as used by the Firearms Training Team for the Calgary, Canada police force.

Commercial use 
 Craft International logo, military training company founded by Chris Kyle
 Wilhelm "Deathshead" Strasse, a major antagonist in the Wolfenstein series
 Sometimes placed within a circle next to a 6 to represent Death in June

Other uses 
In the United States, the skull & crossbones symbol has often been used to indicate a poisonous substance.

Etymology
Toten-Kopf translates literally to "Dead's Head", meaning exactly "dead person's head". Semantically, it refers to a skull, literally a Schädel.  As a term, Totenkopf connotes the human skull as a symbol, typically one with crossed thigh bones as part of a grouping.

The common translation of "Totenkopf" as death's head is incorrect; it would be Todeskopf, but no such word is in use -- the English term death squad is called Todesschwadron, not Totenschwadron. It would be a logical fallacy to conclude that usage varies only because of the German naming of the death's-head hawkmoth, which is called skull hawkmoth (Totenkopfschwärmer) in German, in the same way that it would be a fallacy to conclude that the German word for night candle (i.e. Nachtkerze) would mean willowherb, just because the willowherb hawkmoth (Proserpinus proserpina) is called night candle hawkmoth (Nachtkerzenschwärmer, Proserpinus proserpina
) in German.

Contemporary German language meaning of the word Totenkopf has not changed for at least two centuries.  For example, the German poet Clemens Brentano (1778–1842) wrote in the story "Baron Hüpfenstich": "Lauter Totenbeine und Totenköpfe, die standen oben herum ..." (i.e. "A lot of bones and skulls, they were placed above ...").

See also 
 3rd SS Division Totenkopf
 Fascist symbolism
 Human skull symbolism
 Kampfgeschwader 54
 Black Brunswickers
 Jolly Roger
 Kuperjanov Battalion
 Memento mori
 The Punisher
 Skull and Bones
 SS-Totenkopfverbände

References

Bibliography 
 Klaus D. Patzwall: Der SS-Totenkopfring. 5th edition: Patzwall, Melbeck 2010, .
 Joost Hølscher (Author, Illustrator): Death's Head, The History of the Military Skull & Crossbones Badge (The History of Uniform). 1st edition: Éditions Chamerelle 2013, 

Symbols
Military insignia
Military heraldry
Nazi symbolism
Fascist symbols
Heraldic charges